Lars Engqvist (born 13 August 1945) is a Swedish politician. He served as chairman of the youth organization of the Swedish Social Democrats from 1972 to 1978, and then worked as a journalist. He was the editor-in-chief of Arbetet, a Malmö-based newspaper. In the early 1990s he was the mayor of Malmö, and then president of the Swedish Film Institute before receiving his first government appointment in 1998.

On 1 June 2004 he was appointed as deputy Prime Minister of the Swedish government. The main reason for the appointment was to make him the acting prime minister under Göran Persson, when the latter received knee surgery in early June. The appointment would not affect his status as the Minister of Health and Social Affairs, but at the same time it was also announced that Engqvist would step down from his government posts on 1 October, to become the new Governor of Jönköping County.

In April 2005 he was appointed as chairman of the Swedish public service television company Sveriges Television, succeeding Allan Larsson. The appointment drew criticism because of his close ties to the Social Democratic Party and the government.

See also
List of Jönköping Governors

References 

|-

|-

|-

|-

|-

|-

|-

|-

1945 births
County governors of Sweden
Deputy Prime Ministers of Sweden
Living people
Mayors of Malmö
Municipal commissioners of Sweden
Swedish journalists
Swedish Ministers for Health
Swedish Ministers for Social Affairs
Members of the Riksdag 2002–2006
Swedish Ministers for Housing